The Consulate-General of the People's Republic of China in Surabaya (Simplified Chinese: 中华人民共和国驻泗水总领事馆; Traditional Chinese: 中華人民共和國駐泗水總領事館 pinyin: Zhōnghuá Rénmín Gònghéguó Zhù Sìshuǐ Zŏnglĭngshìguān) is a diplomatic mission of the People's Republic of China (PRC) for Indonesia at Jalan Mayjend Soengkono, No. 105, Dukuh Pakis, Surabaya, East Java, Indonesia.

History 

The Consulate General of the People's Republic China in Surabaya is the first Consulate General in Indonesia after the restoration of diplomatic relations between China and Indonesia after Post-Suharto era and was officially launched in November 2006. Due to the establishment of the Consulate General in Denpasar, new consular districts covering 5 provinces include East Java, Central Java, Yogyakata Special Administrative Region, Maluku and North Maluku while the previous consular districts from 4 provinces used to be East Java, Bali, East Nusa Tenggara and West Nusa Tenggara.

Yu Hong is current consul general since 15 June 2015.

See also 

 China–Indonesia relations
 Diplomatic missions of the People's Republic of China

References

External links 

 Consulate-General of the People's Republic of China in Surabaya (Indonesian)
 Consulate-General of the People's Republic of China in Surabaya (Chinese)
 Consulate-General of the People's Republic of China in Surabaya (English)
 Embassy of People's Republic of China in Republic of Indonesia
 Embassy of the Republic of Indonesia in People's Republic of China
 Communiqué of the government of the People's Republic of China and the Government of the Republic of Indonesia on the resumption of diplomatic relations between the two countries
 Joint Press Communiqué of The People's Republic of China and the Republic of Indonesia
 History of China-Indonesian relations

 
China